Baochang High School is a high school in Jiangsu, China.

Overview
The school was founded in April, 1956. Located in the south-east of Jiangsu, it is east of the Yellow Sea and south of the Yangtze River. It covers an area of 130,392,5 square meters with a province-class bodyart museum, science and technology building, laboratory building, office building, classroom building and 22 other main buildings and teaching facilities, such as a cable transmitter and wireless receiver system and campus LAN. There are currently 49 classrooms, 2596 enrolled students, and 221 faculty.

The school has become a Nanjing Art Institute experimental base and provides students for the Nanjing University of Aeronautics and Astronautics. It became the No.124 school in 2000, No.90 in 2001, No. 71 in 2002, in 2003 increased to 50. It also has many well-known alumni, such as Jiyunshi, governor of Hubei province.

References

External  links
  School web page

Schools in Jiangsu